Molybdochalkos is an alloy of copper and lead.  It was known by Greek alchemists as early as the 10th century. It contains 90% lead 10% copper.

External links
http://www.levity.com/alchemy/zosimus_crab.html

Copper alloys
Lead alloys